Nadarzyn  is a village in Pruszków County, Masovian Voivodeship, in east-central Poland. It is the seat of the gmina (administrative district) called Gmina Nadarzyn.

In 2007, the village had a population of 3,198.

Education 
 Wyższa Szkoła Fundacji Kultury Informatycznej (College of the Information Culture Foundation)

International relations

Twin towns – Sister cities
Nadarzyn is twinned with
 Mərdəkan, Azerbaijan

External links
 Jewish Community in Nadarzyn on Virtual Shtetl

References

Villages in Pruszków County